This is a list of the substantive decisions of the Supreme Court of New Zealand.  It is organised in order of the date the case was handed down.

2004

 Prebble v Huata
 Zaoui v Attorney-General
 Siloata v R

2005

 Otago Stations Estates Ltd V Parker
 Timoti v R
 Bryson v Three Foot Six Ltd
 Hemmes v Young
 Westfield (New Zealand) Ltd v North Shore City Council
 Morgan v Superintendent, Rimutaka Prison
 Mist v R
 Bharamitash v Kumar
 Trans Otway v Shephard and Dunphy

2006

 Thompson v R
 Casata Ltd v General Distributors Ltd
 L v R
 Telecom Mobile Ltd v Commerce Commission
 Peter Portable Sawing Systems Ltd (in liq) v Lucas
 Allen v Commissioner of Inland Revenue
 Felton v Johnson
 Mafart and Prieur v Television New Zealand Ltd
 Eastern Services Ltd v No 68 Ltd
 C v Complaints Assessment Committee
 Condon v R
 Shirley v Wairarapa District Health Board
 Steele and Roberts v Serepisos
 Chirnside v Fay
 Chamberlains v Lai
 Secretary for Justice (as the New Zealand Central Authority on behalf of T J) v H
 Henkel KgaA v Holdfast New Zealand Ltd
 Taylor v Jones
 AMP General Insurance Ltd v Bodkins
 Gilchrist v R
 Waitakere City Council v Estates Homes Ltd
 Walsh v R
Zaoui v Attorney-General (No 2)

2007
 Hansen v R
 Paper Reclaim Ltd v Aotearoa International Ltd
 Trustees Executors Ltd v Murray
 Brooker v Police
 Wholesale Distributors Ltd v Gibbons Holdings Ltd
 Commerce Commission v Fonterra Co-Operative Group Ltd
 Larsen v Rick Dees Ltd
 Maruha Corp and Maruha (NZ) Ltd v Amaltal Corp Ltd
 Jiang v R
 Arbuthnot v Chief Executive of the Department of Work and Income
 Royal New Zealand Foundation of the Blind v Auckland City Council
 Southbourne Investments Ltd v Greenmount Manufacturing Ltd
 Rajamani v R
 Taunoa v Attorney-General
 Unison Networks Ltd v Commerce Commission
 Reid v R
 New Zealand Airline Pilots' Assoc Industrial Union of Workers Inc v Air New Zealand Ltd
 Rogers v Television New Zealand Ltd
 Owen v R
 Austin Nichols & Co Inc v Stichting Lodestar
 Ngan v R
Lai v Chamberlains

2008

 Hayes v R
 Dollars & Sense Finance Ltd v Nathan
 Westpac Banking Corp v Commissioner of Inland Revenue
Taunoa v Attorney-General

2011
Mahomed v R  
Hamed & Ors. v R

2013
Taueki v R

2014
Environmental Defence Society v New Zealand King Salmon 
Paki v Attorney-General (No 2)

2016
Booth v R

2018
New Health New Zealand Incorporated v South Taranaki District Council

2022
Peter Hugh McGregor Ellis v The King
Make It 16 Incorporated v Attorney-General (the minimum voting age of 18 years is inconsistent with the New Zealand Bill of Rights Act 1990)

References

 Comprehensive case studies on the official website: http://www.courtsofnz.govt.nz/about/supreme/case-summaries/case-summaries-2008

Supreme Court